Pe, short for Programmer's Editor, is an open source text editor for the Be Operating System (BeOS), Haiku and other BeOS-like operating systems. It is targeted towards source-code editing, and features syntax highlighting for a large number of programming languages. It also works as a basic source-level HTML editor, with some HTML auto-completion support, automatic updating of files included within other files, and direct FTP integration. It is conceptually based on the Macintosh Programmer's Workshop and BBEdit, both of which are editing programs for the Mac OS.

Pe was written by the Dutch programmer Maarten Hekkelman, who also wrote BDB, the source-level debugger for the BeOS, and the spreadsheet Sum-It!, first for classic Mac OS and later BeOS where it was packaged by Beatware as half of BeBasics; a lightweight office suite, which was also open-sourced.

Pe was used to write the BeOS Bible and possible other similar-era Scot Hacker works, as well as In the Beginning... Was the Command Line by Neal Stephenson; both of which works mention it.

Features 

Pe boasts features such as function auto-completion, powerful search-and-replace options, and syntax highlighting for several programming languages. Pe was then ported to Mac OS X, Linux and Windows under the name Pepper, and the original BeOS code was open-sourced.  It has been included in the early builds of Haiku. Code from Pe was also incorporated into PalEdit, the editing component of the Paladin IDE.
General features include:
 Drag-and-drop
 Find and Replace (Multiple File Search)
 Zooming
 Split screen editing and synchronized scrolling
 Open and Save directly from/to Server
 Find Functions
 Change Encoding
 Go to line (By line number)

References

External links
Pe at Haiku

See also 
 Comparison of operating systems
 List of BeOS programs
 BeOS

BeOS text editors
Free software programmed in C++
Free text editors
Software using the MIT license
Text editors